Bang Klam may refer to:

 Bang Klam District, Songkhla Province, Thailand
 Bang Klam Subdistrict, part of Bang Klam district